Guo Sheng is a fictional character in Water Margin, one of the Four Great Classical Novels of Chinese literature. Nicknamed "Comparable to Rengui", he ranks 55th among the 108 Stars of Destiny and 19th among the 72 Earthly Fiends.

Background
Guo Sheng, a native of Jialing (嘉陵; present-day Jialing District, Nanchong, Sichuan), often wears a suit of silvery white armour and a silver belt over a white robe. He also rides a white horse and his weapon is a ji similar to the "Sky Piercer"  (方天畫戟) used by Lü Bu of the Three Kingdoms era. He has learnt his martial arts from a military officer in his hometown. He is nicknamed "Comparable to Rengui" as Xue Rengui, a famous Tang dynasty general, is known to be an expert user of ji.

Initially a trader, Guo Sheng becomes a bandit leader after he lost all his goods in a river during a storm and did not have enough money to travel home.

Joining Liangshan
Guo Sheng hears about Lü Fang being an outstanding user of ji and wants to find out who is more worthy of the weapon. He travels to Mount Duiying (對影山) or Mount Mirror Image, which comprises two facing hills, one of which is occupied by Lü and his bandit gang. Guo settles on the other hill with his own men and challenges Lü to a one-on-one duel on horseback. As neither could win, the engagement goes on and off for days.

Song Jiang, Hua Rong and other outlaws of Mount Qingfeng pass by Mount Duiying as they travel to join Liangshan Marsh after causing mayhem at Qingzhou including routing a government army. They come upon the duel between Guo Sheng and Lü Fang. It happens that the tassels of the two ji get tangled together. The two fighters struggle but could not free their weapons. Seeing that, Hua Rong fires an arrow that hits the tangled point and separates the weapons. Everyone present cheers. Guo and Lü stop their fight and come to greet Hua and his group. Upon learning that the group is going to Liangshan, both want in and are accepted.

Campaigns and death 
After the 108 Stars of Destiny came together in what is called the Grand Assembly, Guo Sheng, together with Lü Fang, is appointed as the guardian of Liangshan's central camp. That means they are personal bodyguards of Song Jiang. Guo Sheng participates in the campaigns against the Liao invaders and rebel forces in Song territory following amnesty by Emperor Huizong for Liangshan.

In the battle at Black Dragon Ridge (烏龍嶺; northeast of present-day Meicheng Town, Jiande, Zhejiang) in the campaign against Fang La, Guo Sheng is crushed to death by boulders rolled down by enemy soldiers as he charges up the slope.

Other mentions
In Jin Yong's wuxia novel The Legend of the Condor Heroes, Guo Sheng is the protagonist Guo Jing's ancestor.

References

 
 
 
 
 
 
 

72 Earthly Fiends
Fictional characters from Sichuan